Jaggayyapeta mandal is one of the 20 mandals in NTR district of the state of Andhra Pradesh in India. It is under the administration of Nandigama revenue division and the headquarters are located at Jaggayyapeta town. Krishna River flows through the mandal and is bounded by Penuganchiprolu, Nandigama, Chandarlapadu mandals of Krishna district, some part of Guntur district, Nalgonda and Khammam districts of Telangana.

Towns and villages 

 census, the mandal has 18 settlements. It includes 1 town and 24 villages.

The settlements in the mandal are listed below:

Note: (CT)-Census town

See also 
Vijayawada revenue division

References 

Mandals in NTR district